Self Help Serenade is the debut album by indie rock band Marjorie Fair, first released in the United Kingdom and Europe on May 31, 2004, and in the United States on July 19, 2005. The album was produced and mixed by Rob Schnapf, "Empty Room" was mixed by Tom Lord-Alge, and the album features guest contributions from Jon Brion and Joey Waronker. "Empty Room" was not included on the UK pressings of the album.

"Empty Room" was featured in the One Tree Hill episode "An Attempt to Tip the Scales" (3.4).

The band were dropped from Capitol Records after the album's release.

Track listing
All tracks written by Evan Slamka.
 "Don't Believe" – 4:18
 "Halfway House" – 5:13
 "Empty Room" – 3:43
 "Stare" – 4:20
 "How Can You Laugh" – 5:07
 "Waves" – 4:13
 "Please Don't" – 4:04
 "Cracks in the Wall" – 4:06
 "Stand in the World" – 5:01
 "Hold on to You" – 2:39
 "Silver Gun" – 5:14
 "My Sun Is Setting Over Her Magic" – 6:28

Singles
"Stare" (May 17, 2004)
 "Stare" –  4:20
 "How Can You Laugh" – 5:07
 "Science of Your Mind" – 4:35
 "Timmy" – 4:36

"Waves" (October 18, 2004)
 "Waves" – 4:13
 "What I Said" – 1:51
 "True Lovers" – 4:36

References

External links
Official album site
Capitol Records artist site

2004 debut albums
Capitol Records albums
Albums produced by Jerry Finn
Albums produced by Rob Schnapf